"Ahora Dice" is a song by Puerto Rican record producer Chris Jedi, interpreted by J Balvin, Ozuna and Arcángel. The official remix features Cardi B, Offset and Anuel AA.

Chart performance 
"Ahora Dice" peaked at number four on the Latin Streaming Songs chart on the issue dated June 24, 2017.

As of December 2022, the music video for the song has received over 1.3 billion views on YouTube.

Charts

Weekly charts

Year-end charts

Certifications

References 

2017 singles
2017 songs
Arcángel (singer) songs
J Balvin songs
Ozuna (singer) songs
Spanish-language songs
Songs written by Chris Jedi
Songs written by Rafael Pina
Latin trap songs